William Ripley Nichols (April 30, 1847 – July 14, 1886) was a noted American chemist.

Early life
Nichols was born in Boston, Massachusetts, graduated from the Massachusetts Institute of Technology in 1869, and served there as instructor and assistant professor until 1872, when he was elected professor of general chemistry, which chair he retained until his death in Hamburg, Germany.

Later life
Professor Nichols was recognized as an authority on sanitation, and particularly on water purification, published numerous papers on municipal water supplies, and was active in the pioneering work of the Lawrence Experiment Station. He also performed research at the request of the Massachusetts Board of Health on train ventilation, particularly of smoking cars. He was a member of the American Academy of Arts and Sciences, the American Association for the Advancement of Science, of which he was Vice President in 1885, and of the German Chemical Society.

Selected works 
 Compendious Manual of Qualitative Analysis, by Charles W. Eliot and Frank H. Storer, with Nichols' revisions, 1872.
 An Elementary Manual of Chemistry, abridged from Eliot and Storer, New York, 1S72.
 Water Supply, mainly from a Chemical and Sanitary Standpoint, 1883.
 Experiments in General Chemistry, with Lewis M. Norton, Boston : private printing, 1884.

References 

 "William Ripley Nichols", Appleton's Cyclopedia of American Biography, edited by James Grant Wilson, John Fiske and Stanley L. Klos, New York : D. Appleton and Company, 1887-1889.

19th-century American chemists
1847 births
1886 deaths
Scientists from Boston
Massachusetts Institute of Technology alumni
Massachusetts Institute of Technology faculty
Fellows of the American Academy of Arts and Sciences
Fellows of the American Association for the Advancement of Science